Laby may refer to:

People
 Clemens Laby (1900–1984), German engineer
 Jean Laby (1915–2008), Australian physicist
 T. H. Laby (1880–1946), Australian physicist and chemist

Places
 Läby, Sweden